Cecilia Estlander (born 26 February 1992 in Helsinki) is a Finnish tennis player.

On 11 October 2010, Estlander reached her best singles ranking of world number 956. On 18 July 2011, she peaked at world number 878 in the doubles rankings.

Estlander has a 1–3 record for Finland in Fed Cup competition.

ITF finals (0–1)

Doubles (0–1)

Fed Cup participation

Singles

Doubles

References

External links 
 
 
 

1992 births
Living people
Sportspeople from Helsinki
Finnish female tennis players
California Golden Bears women's tennis players
20th-century Finnish women
21st-century Finnish women